Brian Hudson (born March 1, 1991) is a former American football quarterback. He was signed by the Calgary Stampeders as an undrafted free agent in 2014. He played college football at Campbell University after transferring out of Liberty University.

College career
Hudson committed to Liberty University on December 29, 2008. Hudson redshirted during his true freshman season, and did not see any playing time during his redshirt freshman season. Hudson saw limited action during his sophomore season, appearing in 3 games as a backup. With Mike Brown graduating in 2012, Hudson won the starting quarterback position for the Flames for the 2012 season. After falling out of the starting quarterback position at Liberty, Hudson transferred to Campbell University for his last season of eligibility. Hudson started all 12 games for the Fighting Camels, leading the team in passing and rushing.

College career statistics

Professional career

Calgary Stampeders
On May 23, 2014, Hudson signed with the Calgary Stampeders of the Canadian Football League (CFL). Following their mini-camp, Hudson was released in June 2014.

New Orleans VooDoo
Hudson was assigned to the New Orleans VooDoo of the Arena Football League, along with Adam Kennedy, following a rash of injuries for the VooDoo. With just a week of practice, Kennedy beat out Hudson as the VooDoo's starting quarterback. The following week, Kennedy left the game with bruised ribs, and Hudson entered the game. Hudson finished the game 0-for-3 passing. Hudson remained with the VooDoo the rest of the season, appearing in more one game. During the offseason, the VooDoo picked up Hudson's rookie option to retain him for the 2015 season.

Colorado Ice
On May 5, 2015, Hudson was assigned to the Colorado Ice of the Indoor Football League. Hudson started his first game with the Ice against the Bemidji Axemen. Hudson struggled in what would turn out to be his lone start for the Ice, completing 1-of-9 passes for 13 yards and an interception. He was released on May 11, 2015.

References

External links
Campbell bio
Arena Football League bio

1991 births
Living people
American football quarterbacks
Liberty Flames football players
Campbell Fighting Camels football players
New Orleans VooDoo players
Colorado Crush (IFL) players
Players of American football from Philadelphia